{{DISPLAYTITLE:C14H16ClN3O}}
The molecular formula C14H16ClN3O may refer to:

 ELB-139, an anxiolytic drug with a novel chemical structure, which is used in scientific research
 JNJ-7777120, a drug being developed by Johnson & Johnson Pharmaceutical Research & Development